Miro Oman (11 January 1936 – 15 July 2012) was a Yugoslavian ski jumper.

Career
Oman competed in the late 1950s and throughout the 1960s. He participated at the 1962 Ski Jumping World Championships and 1964 Winter Olympics, albeit without notable results at either event. Between 1959 and 1966 he also competed at the Four Hills Tournament, where his best result was fifteenth place in Garmisch-Partenkirchen in 1963.

1969: Premiere jump in Planica

References

External links

1936 births
2012 deaths
People from Tržič
Slovenian male ski jumpers
Olympic ski jumpers of Yugoslavia
Ski jumpers at the 1964 Winter Olympics